David Y. Choi is a Korean American professor and entrepreneur. He holds the Conrad N. Hilton Chair of Entrepreneurship at Loyola Marymount University.

Early life and education 
Choi was born in Seoul, South Korea and moved to Germany and then to California when he was in high school. He attended UC Berkeley for Engineering and UCLA Anderson for his Ph.D. in Management.

Career
After attending UC Berkeley and UCLA Anderson, Choi worked for The Boston Consulting Group and Harvard Business School before getting more involved in entrepreneurial endeavors and teaching at Loyola Marymount University. Choi was the recipient of the Fritz B. Burns President's Distinguished Teaching Award in 2019 and was appointed to Conrad N. Hilton Chair of Entrepreneurship in 2021. He was a visiting professor at Peking University, Korea Advanced Institute of Science and Technology, and Korea University.

He is a co-author of Values-Centered Entrepreneurs and Their Businesses published by Taylor Francis in 2010.

Honors 
Choi was the recipient of the Fritz B. Burns President's Distinguished Teaching Award in 2019, and was appointed to Conrad N. Hilton Chair of Entrepreneurship in 2021. Choi is the recipient of the Innovative Pedagogy Award for Entrepreneurship from the United States Association of Small Business and Entrepreneurship.

References 

South Korean emigrants to the United States
University of California, Berkeley alumni
Loyola Marymount University faculty
Year of birth missing (living people)
Living people
Businesspeople from Seoul
Boston Consulting Group people
Businesspeople from California
South Korean expatriates in Germany